Roxy Tour was the third headlining concert tour by American singer Khalid, in support of his debut studio album American Teen (2017). The tour began on January 27, 2018, in New York City at the Radio City Music Hall, and concluded on June 7, 2018, in Raleigh, at Red Hat Amphitheater.

Development
Khalid embarked on The Location Tour and American Teen Album to support his debut album, American Teen. After earning five nominations at the 60th Grammy Awards, Khalid announced that he would embark on a headlining concert tour titled Roxy Tour. The tour got its name from Khalid's adopted pit bull, Roxy, whom he rescued from a Los Angeles animal shelter. Then, it was announced that $1 from every ticket sold would be given to local animal shelters on each tour stop. On April 18, it was announced that American-Canadian pop boy band PrettyMuch would join the tour as the opening act.

Commercial performance
According to Billboard Boxscore, the tour generated $8 million in ticket sales and played to 158,727 fans over 23 shows. The highest sold ticket count was at San Francisco's Bill Graham Civic Auditorium on May 5 and 6, playing for 17,482. Vancouver's Rogers Arena hosted the largest crowd on a single show of the tour with 13,470 in attendance on May 2.

Set list 
This set list is from the concert on May 30, 2018, in Toronto, Canada. It is not intended to represent all tour dates.

 "8TEEN"
 "Winter"
 "American Teen"
 "Therapy"
 "Coaster"
 "Another Sad Love Song"
 "The Ways"
 "Saved"
 "Shot Down"
 "Hopeless"
 "Cold Blooded"
 "Angels"
 "Young Dumb & Broke"
 "Silence"
 "Love Lies"
 "Rollin"
 "Let's Go"
 "Location"
 "OTW"

Tour dates

References

2018 concert tours
Concert tours of the United States
Concert tours of Canada